Winkhill railway station was a railway station that served the hamlet of Winkhill, Staffordshire. It was opened by the North Staffordshire Railway (NSR) in 1910 and closed to passenger use in 1935, but remained open to freight traffic until 1964.

Construction and opening
The single line branch was authorised on 1 March 1899 by the Leek, Caldon Low, and Hartington Light Railways Order, 1898, and construction took several years, the line not opening until 1905.

The station at Winkhill was a later addition to the line.  Although a station was included in the original tender for construction of the branch line, it wasn't until 1908 that a single siding for freight traffic was provided at the location and another two years before a station was constructed for passenger traffic.

Station layout
The station had a single platform and a single siding with limited goods facilities.

Closure
The branch line was never a financial success and passenger services were withdrawn on 30 September 1935. The station remained open as a goods station until May 1964 when all traffic on the branch except mineral workings from Caldon Low quarries was withdrawn.

Route

Notes

References
 
 
 

Disused railway stations in Staffordshire
Railway stations in Great Britain opened in 1910
Railway stations in Great Britain closed in 1935
Former North Staffordshire Railway stations
Staffordshire Moorlands